Charbonnel et Walker Chocolatier is a British firm of chocolate makers based in Bond Street, London.

History 
Encouraged by Albert, Prince of Wales, later King Edward VII, in 1875 Mme Virginie Eugenie Lévy, née Charbonnel, of Maison Boissier chocolate house in Paris, and Mrs Minnie Walker began a partnership in London as "Parisian Confectioners and Bon-Bon Manufacturers". The partnership of Charbonnel and [sic] Walker was dissolved on 16 April 1878 and Mrs Walker carried on alone until her death on 8 June 1883.  The notice of death published in the London Gazette referred to "Mary Ann Alphandery also known as Minnie Walker". The company of Charbonnel and Walker Limited went into liquidation in June 1894. The connection with the royal family continues to the present day, as Charbonnel et Walker hold a Royal Warrant as Chocolate Manufacturers to the Queen.

The new firm of Charbonnel et Walker is now based in the Royal Arcade in Bond Street, not far from the original premises, and manufactured its chocolates at its factory in Tunbridge Wells, Kent, until 2018 when it relocated their production to Poundbury, Dorset.

The company claims a number of notable figures from history to have been customers, such as Noël Coward (who is said to have requested a fortnightly delivery box of their finest selections to his home), Wallis Simpson, Sir John Gielgud, Sir Alec Guinness, Lauren Bacall, Princess Diana and Princess Margaret. Prince Francis of Teck, the younger brother of the British queen Mary of Teck, bequeathed the Teck Emeralds to his mistress "after courting her with Charbonnel et Walker chocolates."

Confectioneries
Charbonnel et Walker offers a wide variety of chocolates, as well as sugar confections like crystalized ginger and glazed brazil nuts. A speciality is the Marc de Champagne Chocolate Truffles: these are chocolate truffles with chocolate butter infused with Marc de Champagne.

The company also produces a themed "James Bond – 007" range, inspired by the James Bond film franchise, including 007 Dry Martini Truffles. Their hot drinking chocolate was created by Madame Charbonnel in 1875; it is available in Original and Sea Salt Caramel flavours.

Branches 
, there are four Charbonnel et Walker shops in the UK, as well as two outlets in department stores:

 Old Bond Street Store, London
 Canary Wharf Store, London
 Leeds Store, West Yorkshire
 Broadgate Circle Store, London
 Harrods – Chocolate Room (Ground Floor), London
 Selfridges – Chocolate Room (Lower Ground Floor), London

References

Further reading

External links
Charbonnel et Walker UK
Charbonnel Chocolates US Website
Charonnel et Walker Hong Kong

Food and drink companies established in 1875
British chocolate companies
Food manufacturers based in London
British brands
British Royal Warrant holders